Richard Clarence Clark (born September 14, 1928) is an American politician who represented the state of Iowa in the United States Senate from 1973 to 1979.

Early life
Richard Clarence Clark was born on September 14, 1928, in Paris, Iowa. He graduated from Lamont High School in 1947 and enlisted in the U.S. Army, serving in Europe during the Korean War. Clark was educated at the University of Maryland, Wiesbaden and the University of Frankfurt from 1950 to 1952 during his military service. He completed his BA in 1953 at Upper Iowa University and his Masters in 1956 at the University of Iowa. He then became a professor at Upper Iowa University and a Democratic Party volunteer, working to collect names, addresses and phone numbers of party members with the goal of contacting them on election day to get them to the polls. This resulted in Democratic victories in an otherwise Republican area. 

This caught the attention of attorney John Culver of Cedar Rapids, Iowa, who enlisted Clark to help run his congressional campaign in 1964. After their victory, Clark became Culver's administrative assistant, and the pair modernized the Iowa Democratic Party's grassroots efforts in the state, building up a sophisticated voter turnout organization that progressed from names on index cards to computerized databases. 

In 1971, Culver was contemplating running for the U.S. Senate. He dispatched Clark to travel the state to set up infrastructure for a potential Culver candidacy. However, in early 1972, Culver determined that defeating entrenched incumbent Republican Senator Jack R. Miller was impossible and bowed out of the race. With the infrastructure set up and no other Democratic candidates in the race, Clark decided to enter himself.

U.S. Senate

All throughout the campaign, polls taken showed Clark trailing incumbent Jack R. Miller by lopsided margins. A critical part of Clark's campaign was his 1,300-mile walk across the state to gain publicity. Clark's energetic campaign caused him to win in an upset, receiving 662,637 votes (55%) to Miller's 530,525 (44%). American Independent Party candidate William Rocap received 8,954 votes (1%). In 1974, Clark would be joined by Culver, his former boss, who rode to victory because of the unpopular national Republican Party in the wake of the Watergate scandal.

Clark was a very liberal senator, consistently being ranked among the most liberal in the Senate throughout his tenure. He served on the Senate Foreign Relations Committee and chaired the Subcommittee on Africa, developing considerable expertise on the crisis in Angola. In 1976, he authored the Clark Amendment, which barred aid from the U.S. government to private groups engaged in military or paramilitary operations in Angola.

Clark ran for reelection in 1978 against Republican Roger Jepsen. Because of his efforts against the apartheid government in South Africa, Jepsen taunted him as "the Senator from Africa." In a nationally poor year for Democrats, Clark lost the seat by a narrow margin. He was then appointed by President Jimmy Carter to be Ambassador at Large and United States Coordinator for Refugee Affairs in 1979. He has served as a senior fellow at the Aspen Institute for Humanistic Studies since 1980.

As senator, he served on the Committee on Agriculture, Nutrition, and Forestry, the Committee on Environment and Public Works and the Committee on Small Business and Entrepreneurship.

See also
Angolan Civil War
Clark Amendment
Treaty Powers Resolution

References

External links
Congressional Biography
Description of Dick Clark's papers at the University of Iowa

 

1928 births
Living people
Upper Iowa University alumni
University of Iowa alumni
Iowa Democrats
Democratic Party United States senators from Iowa
Upper Iowa University faculty
University of Maryland Global Campus alumni
Goethe University Frankfurt alumni
People from Linn County, Iowa
Military personnel from Iowa
United States congressional aides
United States Ambassadors-at-Large